Jive Bunny: The Album is the debut album by Jive Bunny and the Mastermixers, released in 1989 by Telstar Records and produced by Les Hemstock and Andy Pickles. It includes two UK number one singles: "Swing the Mood" and "That's What I Like". Each of the album's tracks is made up of a medley of songs and samples from the 1940s to the 1970s.

The album peaked at number two on the UK Albums Chart and was the Christmas number two album that year.

Track listing
"Swing the Mood" – 6:28
"Rock and Roll Party Mix" – 4:07
"Lover's Mix" – 5:56
"Do You Wanna Rock" – 6:23
"That's What I Like" – 5:37
"Glenn Miller Medley" – 4:05
"Swing Sisters Swing" – 5:23
"Hopping Mad" – 6:30

Featured songs and samples
Track 1: "In the Mood", "Pennsylvania 6-5000", "Little Brown Jug", "Let's Twist Again", "Rock Around the Clock", "Rock-A-Beatin' Boogie", "Tutti Frutti", "Wake Up Little Susie", "C'mon Everybody", "Hound Dog", "Shake, Rattle and Roll", "All Shook Up", "Jailhouse Rock", "At the Hop".
Track 2: "Tutti Frutti", "Roll Over Beethoven", "Ooh! My Soul", "Keep A-Knockin'". Chubby Checker samples: "Tutti Frutti", "Shout! Shout! (Knock Yourself Out)".
Track 3: "All I Have to Do Is Dream", "Silence Is Golden", "Rhythm of the Rain", "Will You Still Love Me Tomorrow", "Diana".
Track 4: "Do You Wanna Dance", "Do You Wanna Touch Me", "Get It On", "Teenage Rampage". Samples: "Hot Love", "Devil Gate Drive", "I'm the Leader of the Gang".
Track 5: "Hawaii 5-0", "Let's Twist Again", "Let's Dance", "Wipe Out", "Great Balls of Fire", "Johnny B. Goode" riff, "Good Golly, Miss Molly", "The Twist", "Summertime Blues" riff, "Razzle Dazzle", "Runaround Sue", "Chantilly Lace".
Track 6: "In the Mood", "Little Brown Jug", "American Patrol", "Pennsylvania 6-5000".
Track 7: "Chattanooga Choo Choo", "Don't Sit Under the Apple Tree (with Anyone Else but Me)", "Hold Tight", "The Coffee Song", "Lullaby of Broadway", "Boogie Woogie Bugle Boy", "Chattanooga Choo Choo", "A String of Pearls", "Saint Louis Blues", "Chattanooga Choo Choo".
Track 8: "Shout", "March of the Mods", "Da Doo Ron Ron", "Come Back My Love", "Runaway", "Poetry in Motion", "Lucille", "I'm into Something Good", "Help Me, Rhonda".

Chart performance

Weekly charts

Year-end charts

Certifications and sales

References

1989 debut albums
Telstar Records albums